The Dr Samuel Mayes House is a historic house in Columbia, Tennessee, USA.

History
The house was built in 1818 for Dr Samuel Mayes, a physician. It was designed in the Federal architectural style.

Architectural significance
It has been listed on the National Register of Historic Places since October 25, 1993.

References

Houses on the National Register of Historic Places in Tennessee
Federal architecture in Tennessee
Houses completed in 1818
Houses in Columbia, Tennessee
National Register of Historic Places in Maury County, Tennessee